Douglas Robert Ford Jr.   (born November 20, 1964) is a Canadian politician and businessman who has served as the 26th and current premier of Ontario since June 2018 and leader of the Progressive Conservative (PC) Party since March 2018. He represents the Toronto riding of Etobicoke North in the Legislative Assembly of Ontario.

With his brother Randy, Ford co-owns Deco Labels and Tags, a printing business operating in Canada and the United States that was founded by their father, Doug Ford Sr., who served as a Member of Provincial Parliament (MPP) from 1995 to 1999. Ford was a Toronto city councillor for Ward 2 Etobicoke North from 2010 to 2014 at the same time that his brother, Rob Ford, was mayor of Toronto. Ford ran for the 2014 Toronto mayoral election, where he placed second behind John Tory. In 2018, Ford won the party leadership election of the PC Party and led the PCs to majority victories in the 2018 and 2022 general elections.

Early life, family, and education
Born in Etobicoke, Ontario, Ford was the second of four children of Doug Bruce Ford Sr. and Ruth Diane Ford ( Campbell). His paternal grandparents were English immigrants. He graduated grade twelve from Scarlett Heights Collegiate Institute. He then attended Humber College for two months before dropping out with no degree.

Early business career
In the 1990s, Ford became involved in the running of Deco Labels and Tags, a business co-founded by his father in 1962. The company makes pressure-sensitive labels for plastic-wrapped grocery products. Doug Jr. became president of the company in 2002, and was responsible for the company's expansion into Chicago. Nearing his death, his father divided up the company, leaving 40 percent to Doug Jr., 40 percent to Randy and 20 percent to Rob. In 2008, Doug Jr. launched the purchase of Wise Tag and Label in New Jersey and fired Wise Tag's manager. Former Deco employees suggest that the Chicago branch was well-managed under Doug Jr., and that he was well-liked but that the company declined under Randy's leadership after Doug Jr. entered politics in 2010. , Ford and his mother were directors of the company, managed by his brother Randy.

Early involvement in politics
Ford's first involvement in politics came when Doug Holyday approached Deco to print stickers for signs for his 1994 mayoral campaign in Etobicoke. Ford took it upon himself to canvass for Holyday. He then assisted in his father's campaigns as a PC MPP candidate in 1995 and 1999. He also ran his brother Rob's council campaigns in 2000, 2003, and 2006, and Rob's winning mayoral campaign in 2010.

Municipal politics
On October 25, 2010, Ford was elected as councillor to Toronto City Council in Ward 2. He succeeded his brother, Rob, who ran successfully for mayor of Toronto. Upon election, Doug Ford announced that he would donate his $100,000 annual salary to community organizations.

As a city councillor, Ford voted to privatize garbage pickup west of Yonge Street, declare the Toronto Transit Commission an essential service, reduce the office budget of city councillors and eliminate the vehicle registration tax.

Boards and agencies
While on city council, Ford served on the board of Build Toronto, an arm's-length city body responsible for developing and selling city land. He was also a director of the Canadian National Exhibition, and served on the Budget Committee, the Civic Appointments Committee and the Government Management Committee at Council.

Ford was a member of the board of Toronto Transit Infrastructure Limited, a corporation set up to finance a Sheppard Avenue subway extension, which Council later cancelled. In 2011, Ford promoted an alternative plan for the Port Lands district of Toronto, including a monorail, a boat-in hotel, the world's largest Ferris wheel and a mega-mall. The plan was ridiculed in the media and council voted it down—including by members of the mayoral executive committee.

Other events while councillor
Ford caused controversy after revealing that his brother Rob would be served a subpoena if Rob's friend and driver Alexander Lisi went to court over charges of extortion. Ford commented that the subpoena was in "payback" for Toronto Police Chief Bill Blair not getting a contract renewal with the Toronto Police Service, saying "This is why we need a change at the top", in regards to Blair's contract. Blair filed a defamation lawsuit, demanding a written apology in exchange for dropping the suit. Ford apologized and retracted the comments.

An investigative report by The Globe and Mail published in May 2013 alleged that Ford had sold hashish at James Gardens for several years in the 1980s, based on interviews with anonymous sources. Ford, who had never been charged with drug possession or trafficking, denied the allegations and accused the newspaper of unfairly targeting his brother, then-mayor Rob Ford. The newspaper defended its report and its use of anonymous sources at an Ontario Press Council hearing, which dismissed complaints against the newspaper and found that its coverage was "fair and ethical". Ford said at the time that he planned to sue the newspaper for libel. When asked in a 2018 interview why he had not sued, he replied that he had decided a lawsuit would be a "waste of time".

Ford opposed a house for developmentally disabled youth in his ward, saying the home had "ruined the community".

Aspirations for higher office and 2014 mayoral candidacy

In June 2013, Ford announced that he would not run for re-election as councillor in the next Toronto election, scheduled for 2014: "I won't be running next time, at least down here I won't be running, I'll be running away from this place in 16 months", expressing his frustration with municipal politics. It was speculated at the time that Ford may be a Progressive Conservative candidate for a future Ontario election, or interested in the leadership of the PCs. On February 20, 2014, after meeting with PC leader Tim Hudak, Ford announced that he would not be a candidate in the next provincial election, which was called for June 12, 2014, so that he could focus on his brother's re-election campaign. Ford explained, "The timing right now just doesn't work."

After his brother Rob entered drug rehab in May 2014, Ford commented that he would not rule out running for mayor. Rob returned from rehab and continued his campaign for mayor, but withdrew after he was diagnosed with an abdominal tumour and hospitalized. Doug Ford then entered the mayoral campaign in the last hour before the nomination deadline on September 12, 2014. Comments Ford made during the campaign received criticism for alleged bigotry, such as misogyny and antisemitism, and critics accused him of conflict of interest and of drug dealing in the past. Though voters viewed the brothers as having the same ideological stance and gave them similar levels of support, Rob's drug scandal received little attention with regard to Doug's campaign.

Ford's campaign got the attention of Last Week Tonights John Oliver, who closed an episode begging Torontonians to vote for Doug Ford for the world's amusement. Doug Ford maintained the support that Rob had in the polls and made no significant ground against frontrunner John Tory, but maintained his lead over Olivia Chow. Ford lost the election to Tory, having 34 percent of the support compared to Tory's 40 percent. Ford's campaign was fined $11,950 for placing 478 illegal lawn signs during the campaign, including placing signs on the Don Valley Parkway, the Gardiner Expressway, and on civic buildings and parks.

Following his unsuccessful mayoral candidacy, there was speculation that Ford would become a candidate for the leadership of the Progressive Conservative Party of Ontario. Ford told reporters: "It's on the table, I would really consider it", and added: "Our campaign is ready to go. Our people are itching to get involved. We are miles ahead of the other candidates." On November 27, 2014, Ford announced that he would not be a candidate for the position and endorsed the candidacy of family friend Christine Elliott.

Ford Nation book 
A book by Doug and Rob Ford titled Ford Nation: Two Brothers, One Vision – The True Story of the People's Mayor appeared in 2016.

Integrity commissioner ruling against Ford
In December 2016, the City of Toronto's integrity commissioner concluded that Ford broke the city's code of conduct when he was a councillor finding that Ford improperly used his influence in municipal matters pertaining to two companies that were clients of his family's company. Integrity Commissioner Valerie Jepson ruled that: "Councillor Ford took no steps to establish clear lines of separation between his responsibilities as a member of Council and his duties as a principal of Deco."

Since Ford was no longer a councillor by the time the ruling was issued, the commissioner did not recommend any sanctions for Ford.

Political blind date 
In a November 2017 episode of the TVO series Political Blind Date, Ford was paired with then Ontario New Democratic Party (NDP) Bramalea—Gore—Malton MPP, Jagmeet Singh (who would later go on to lead the federal NDP). The pair explored different forms of transportation, with Singh taking Ford on a downtown Toronto bicycle ride while Ford drove Singh along the dedicated streetcar right-of-way on St. Clair Avenue. Ford said of the experience that the two became friends, and Singh said Ford was "very warm and friendly".

Cancelled 2018 Toronto mayoral campaign
On September 9, 2017, Ford announced at his family's annual barbecue that he would run for mayor of Toronto in the 2018 election, saying "this one's for you, Robbie", referring to his younger brother Rob who had died the previous year. Ford said that his opponent, John Tory, was "all talk and broken promises". On February 1, 2018, Ford announced that he no longer planned to run for mayor that year because he intended to focus entirely on his campaign for Ontario PC leader.

Provincial politics

2018 Progressive Conservative leadership campaign

Following the sudden resignation of Patrick Brown on January 25, 2018, the Progressive Conservative Party of Ontario announced a new leader would need to be chosen before the 2018 Ontario general election in June. Ford was the first candidate to announce, on January 29, that he would seek the leadership of the party. On January 31, 2018, Ford announced he would seek the PC nomination in Etobicoke North and run for the seat in the 2018 election. He was one of the four official candidates running for the PC leadership along with Christine Elliott, Caroline Mulroney, and Tanya Granic Allen.
 
Ford promised to represent the interests of Northern Ontario in Queen's Park. He called his opponents "insiders" and "political elites", who did not represent the interests of the residents of Northern Ontario like he could. Ford pledged several northern-focused policy initiatives including moving forward with resource development in the Northern Ontario Ring of Fire and reinstating the Ontario Northland Railway's Northlander train service.

Ford called the Ontario health care system "broken" while relating the hospital experience of his brother Rob. He explained that Rob fell while being guided to a chair, and as the hospital was understaffed Doug had to rush down eleven floors to find security guards to help. He stated that the province should support transportation to allow Northern Ontarians to travel quickly and easily to the south to receive medical care and should increase provincial support for Ontario's small and medium-sized hospitals.

Polling results ahead of the leadership ballot were mixed. A February Ipsos/Global News poll found that Ford had the most support of all the PC leadership candidates in Toronto and would beat the Liberals in the city by nine points, but a Mainstreet poll showed him doing only marginally better than the other PC candidates except Patrick Brown, and a Forum Research poll suggested he would have less support than the other candidates.

On March 10, Ford won the PC leadership on the third ballot. The results were too close to call and there was a dispute over whether some votes were allocated to the correct electoral districts, so the announcement was not be made at the originally scheduled convention. A news conference was held later that night after a recount was completed. Elliott conceded the next day and endorsed Ford as leader.

On March 27, 2018, Ford was named the party's candidate in Etobicoke North.

2018 Ontario general election 

In March 2018, the Liberals tabled a pre-election budget in the provincial legislature which promised billions of dollars in new spending for free childcare and expanded coverage for dental care but replaced the government's previous balanced budget with a $6.7 billion deficit projected to last until 2024–2025. Ford called the budget a "spending spree". He said he would condense the Conservative platform adopted under former leader Patrick Brown, reducing "about ten percent of [it]", into a five-point plan focusing on health, education, creating jobs, getting rid of the province's cap and trade program for carbon emissions, and reducing electricity rates.

Ford was critical of the sex education components of the Ontario health curriculum which was updated in 2015, and stated that he believed it needed to be reviewed. He suggested that minors should be required to consult their parents before obtaining an abortion, and indicated he would allow the introduction of a private member's bill requiring parental consent. Liberal campaign co-chair Deb Matthews accused Ford of wading into "divisive social conservative issues" with his remarks.

Ford said he would revive manufacturing in Ontario by easing regulations, cutting taxes, and ensuring competitive electricity rates. Ford criticized the Liberal government for not proceeding quickly enough to develop the Northern Ontario Ring of Fire, saying that he'd get on a bulldozer himself if necessary. Northern Ontario newspaper The Chronicle-Journal criticized Ford's remarks as being "simplistic" in regards to Indigenous land claims and ensuring Indigenous communities receive a share of any economic gains.

Ford announced at an April 3 rally in Hamilton, Ontario, that if elected his government would allow Hamilton City Council to reallocate the $1.3 billion allocated for the city's proposed rapid transit system to roads or other infrastructure. Hamilton mayor Fred Eisenberger responded saying that city council had already decided the issue and that cancelling the LRT would mean $100 million would "be thrown away". Ted McMeekin, a local Liberal MPP, criticized Ford's announcement saying "He paints himself as a responsible fiscal person but sees nothing wrong with writing a blank cheque for $1.2 billion."

In early April, the CBC published their analysis of aggregate polls showing that Ford and the Progressive Conservatives were ahead of the other parties averaging 42.1 percent support, compared to 27.2 percent for the governing Liberals, 23.4 percent for the NDP and 5.7 percent for the Greens and with 11 Liberal MPPs announcing they would not be running for re-election or having already resigned their seats in the months leading up to the election.

Ford and the PC Party received the endorsement of former Toronto mayor Mel Lastman and former Mississauga mayor Hazel McCallion. In explaining her choice not to support Kathleen Wynne's Liberals, McCallion said "As mayor, I never ran the city based on debt. I know the real Doug Ford. He's hardworking, he cares about people of all ages and can be trusted." In the media, Ford was compared to U.S. President Donald Trump. The Guardian described Ford as a "businessman turned anti-establishment politician", a "son of a wealthy entrepreneur" who "rails against elites" and "often shuns expertise", while noting a sharp difference with Trump by pointing out that during his 2014 Toronto mayoral campaign "Ford drummed up strong support among some of the city’s most diverse neighbourhoods, suggesting his populist touch resonates with immigrants and racialized minorities who have traditionally self-identified as disenfranchised". Ford rejected the comparisons while praising some of Trump's policies.

Ford led the PC Party to a majority government in the general election held on June 7, 2018, taking 76 of 124 seats in the Legislative Assembly of Ontario, including his own riding of Etobicoke North. Ford had been PC leader for less than 100 days when his party won the election.

Premier of Ontario

Ford was sworn in as premier on June 29, 2018, incorporating a ceremony outdoors on the lawn of Queen's Park. Ford is the first newly elected MPP to take office as premier since Mitch Hepburn did so in 1934.

Provincial finances
Ford is a fiscal conservative. He supports across-the-board tax reductions at all three levels of government. As a Toronto city councilor and mayoral candidate, Ford supported eliminating the car registration tax, eliminating the land transfer tax and keeping property tax increases below the rate of inflation, and as leader of the Ontario PC Party and the premier, Ford promised to reduce provincial taxes. His proposals included eliminating cap and trade, eliminating the provincial income tax for minimum wage workers, reducing middle-class income tax rates, reducing the corporate income tax, reducing the small business tax and reducing the gasoline tax.

2018 campaign promises
Ford believes in reducing overall government spending. Ford proposed reducing government spending enough to pay for his proposed tax cuts and to balance the budget. He pledged to introduce a moratorium on wind and solar projects and to cancel subsidies for electric cars. He also promised to end the practice of giving subsidies and grants to businesses on a case-by-case basis and to cancel the Jobs and Prosperity Fund. Ford's government cancelled the basic income pilot project. He opposes the laying off of government workers. He supports the use of attrition to eliminate government jobs that he believes are not needed. Ford believes in hiring independent auditors to audit government spending.

Ford opposes deficit spending and the accumulation of debt. He has criticized provincial governments for accumulating debt and for spending money on interest payments. Ford promised to balance the budget within his first term as premier.

Liquor pricing 
Ford campaigned on "buck-a-beer" and reduced the minimum price of beer from $1.25 to $1. The program saw low adoption by breweries and resellers. As a result of lowering the price floor, a regulation that capped annual increases in pricing that was tied to the Consumer Price Index (CPI) was also eliminated and is projected to result in increased prices overall.

Low-Income Individuals and Families Tax credit (LIFT)
On November 15, 2018, Finance Minister Vic Fedeli tabled the 2018 Ontario Economic Outlook which included a tax cut representing as much as $850 a year for individuals and $1,700 for couples. LIFT would mean that a single person working full-time in minimum wage job, would pay no provincial personal income tax. Minimum wage workers would still pay federal income tax which represents 75 percent of the tax rate. LIFT is a variation on Ford's promise to cut taxes on those making less than $30,000 a year. The amount of the tax credit applies only to minimum wage earners with full-time jobs. An individual who works part-time at $20 an hour but only earns $20,000 a year, would not be eligible. Economist Sheila Block said that a $15 minimum wage would represent about $1,100 more a year for low income earners than Ford's tax credit. In September 2018, Ford's government froze the minimum wage at $14 per hour and cancelled a planned increase.

Carbon tax

On June 15, 2018, then premier-designate, Ford announced in a statement that one of the first actions of his newly formed cabinet would be to eliminate the province's cap and trade program under the 2016 Climate Change Mitigation and Low-Carbon Economy Act, a polluter pay bill that "generated funds for climate change mitigation and adaptation," put in place by the Liberal government. As premier, through the Cap and Trade Cancellation Act, 2018 which was tabled on July 25, 2018, Ford repealed cap and trade as part of his promise to lower gasoline prices by 10 cents per litre. A court later ruled that as Ontario's Environmental Bill of Rights required the government hold public consultations before removing the program, the government's unilateral decision broke the law. As federal law requires provinces to have in place their own pollution pricing system, as a result of Ontario withdrawing from the Western Climate Initiative, a carbon tax was automatically imposed on the province.

Ford had warned that the imposition of the federal carbon tax would result in an increase in the price of gas in Ontario. According to fuel price analyst Patrick DeHaan, the average retail price of gas increased from 114.3 cents per litre before the carbon tax to "117.9 cents on April 1, the first day of the new tax" and 125.3 cents per litre in mid-July. There has been a 9.2 per cent drop in gasoline prices across Canada over the last year, according to the July 17, 2019 Statistics Canada report which resulted in inflation falling nationally in June 2019 to 2.0 per cent. DeHaan said that in July 2018 the average price of gas in Ontario had been 130.1 cents per litre. He added that the retail price of gas reflects the drop in the price of oil prices from US$72 per barrel to US$60 a barrel in 2019 and is not related to the carbon tax. As a result, rebates for electric vehicles funded through the program were cancelled, and a program known as the Green Ontario Fund, which was financed by the proceeds of cap-and-trade auctions and aimed to help homeowners reduce their carbon footprint and reduce hydro bills, was eliminated.

In July, Canadian Prime Minister Justin Trudeau said that provinces that do not adopt a carbon pricing mechanism by September 1, 2018, would be subject to a federal carbon tax of $20/tonne starting in January 2019. Ontario's "fiscal watchdog" and other analysts said that the province will have to refund an estimated $3 billion in carbon credits over four years purchased under the cap and trade program. By mid-November 2018, The Globe and Mail reported that the Ontario government had "lost $2.7-billion in revenue" which included the $1.5-billion loss of revenue from the elimination of the cap-and-trade program.

Ford has worked with the premiers of Saskatchewan, Manitoba and New Brunswick to fight the federal government's carbon tax legislation, and has also supported campaigns to repeal the carbon tax led by federal Conservative Party leader Andrew Scheer and Alberta United Conservative Party leader Jason Kenney. Ford believes the federal Greenhouse Gas Pollution Pricing Act, which imposes a carbon tax on provinces that do not have their own pollution pricing regime is unconstitutional. He committed $30 million to challenge the federal legislation, $4 million of which was spent on anti-carbon pricing advertisements including printing anti-carbon pricing stickers and imposing fines for gas station owners failing to display the stickers. The province mandating the display of the stickers was later ruled to be itself unconstitutional, in violation of section 2(b) of the Canadian Charter of Rights and Freedoms, which guarantees business owners' freedom of expression.

The Supreme Court of Canada later ruled that the constitution allows for the federal government to introduce pollution pricing on behalf of provinces who do not have their own regime.

Healthcare
In 2018, Ford expressed support for publicly funded healthcare and a belief that funding should be increased to create 30,000 additional long-term care beds. In 2020, Ford's government spent $3.5 billion less on health care than budgeted.

Ford believes that the provincial government should fully subsidize dental costs for low-income seniors.

Ford has been accused of attempting to privatize healthcare in the province of Ontario. In August 2022, Ford suggested additional private deliveries of healthcare in order to supplement existing public healthcare in response to a hospital staff shortage throughout Ontario.

Ontario Health 

The Ford government introduced the Ontario Health agency in 2019, with the goal of centralizing services. The province expects to save $350 million a year by 2021–22.

The introduction of the agency has been criticized however, as similar approach was introduced in Alberta, which has the highest per capita healthcare spending in the country, with the NDP noting that "In British Columbia and in Alberta, health centralization wasted billions of dollars", and as wasting "time, money and energy on reshaping the health bureaucracy" rather than "specific solutions to well-identified problems."

Education
Immediately after taking office in 2018, Ford proposed to cut 3,475 Ontario teaching jobs over four years to save $292 million a year, Ford also cancelled the Green Ontario Fund residential rebate program which included a $100 million fund for public school repair, free prescriptions to youth 24 and under, and an initiative to add indigenous peoples content to school curriculum, and eliminated free tuition for low-income students (while reducing tuition fees by 10 per cent),

On July 11, 2018, Ford announced that Ontario's health curriculum including sexual education components, updated by the previous government in 2015, would be reverted to the 1998 curriculum before the next school year. He pledged to create a new sex-education curriculum after consulting with parents and teachers. Ford stated the sex-education curriculum needed to be changed because it was not age-appropriate and not based on enough consultation. He also opposes teaching students about non-binary genders.

Ford believes that financial literacy education should be expanded and included in school curricula, and believes Ontario's math curriculum should drop discovery learning and put a greater emphasis on arithmetic and memorization of the multiplication table.

Ford used back-to-work legislation to end the 2018 strike at York University prior to the start of the 2018–2019 school year. The strike had gone on for over four months, making it the longest post-secondary strike in Canadian history. Ford ordered all public universities and colleges in Ontario to develop free-speech policies that meet his government's expectations and stated that universities and colleges that do not comply will face funding reductions.

By June 2019, the Ford government had removed or decreased funding for "school programs like after-school jobs for youth in low-income neighbourhoods", "tutors in classrooms", "daily physical activity for elementary students", "financial assistance for college and university students", "free tuition for low-income students", and "three satellite university campuses". He also "increased class sizes" and "cancelled three summer curriculum-writing sessions—one mandated by the Truth and Reconciliation Commission and two others.

Ford's government introduced Bill 28, known as the Keeping Students in Class Act, which was passed by the Legislative Assembly of Ontario on November 3, 2022, amid ongoing labour negotiations with the Canadian Union of Public Employees (CUPE). CUPE had given notice of job action October 30 after negotiations broke down with the Ministry of Education, and would have been in a legal strike position on November 4. Bill 28 imposes a contract on CUPE, and makes it illegal to strike, setting fines of $4000 for workers.

The bill invokes the notwithstanding clause, shielding it from being struck down by the courts by allowing the bill to operate despite the right to collective bargaining granted by the Canadian Charter of Rights and Freedoms. The legislation was widely condemned, including by opposition parties, the Canadian Civil Liberties Association, Prime Minister Justin Trudeau, Minister of Justice and Attorney General of Canada David Lametti, the Ontario Bar Association, and other unions including those which had previously endorsed the PC Party.

Despite the government's bill, CUPE went on strike anyway, resulting in province-wide school closures and protests in support of education workers. The government challenged CUPE at the Ontario Labour Relations Board. On November 7, 2022, Ford announced that he would rescind Bill 28 and that he would resume negotiations with CUPE. Following the strike, Ford said he did not regret his use of the notwithstanding clause in imposing the contract and said that it helped both sides "come to their senses".

Municipal affairs 
Prior to his election as premier, Ford was a Toronto city councillor during the tenure of his brother, Rob Ford, as mayor of Toronto. In 2014, Doug took over this brother's mayoral campaign, running against Olivia Chow and eventual winner John Tory.

Provincially, Ford's riding as a member of Provincial Parliament is in the Toronto suburb of Etobicoke.

Toronto City Council 

Ford believes that the constitution does not prevent provincial governments from changing the size of municipal councils, even after an election campaign has already begun. After his government's legislation to reduce the number of wards represented at Toronto City Council was ruled unconstitutional, Ford pledged to invoke section 33's notwithstanding clause of the Canadian Charter of Rights and Freedoms which would allow him to bypass the Charter and implement the legislation regardless of the court's ruling. The Ontario Court of Appeal later ruled in Ford's favour and allowed his modification to the council. The matter was further appealed by the City of Toronto and is now under consideration by the Supreme Court.

Public transit
Ford is proponent of subways. He believed that the provincial government should assume control over the Toronto subway. In February 2020, Ford and Toronto Mayor John Tory signed a preliminary agreement which would see the province assume "sole responsibility for the planning, design and construction" for Ontario Line, the three-stop Line 2 subway extension into Scarborough, the Yonge North subway extension and the Eglinton Crosstown west extension. In 2020, construction began on the Hurontario LRT line in Mississauga and Brampton.

Municipal spending cuts 
In 2019, the government announced that it would adjust the cost-sharing arrangement for Toronto Public Health and Toronto Paramedic Services resulting in retroactive cuts that would total $177 million a year and $1 billion cut in Toronto over 10 years. The cuts were criticized by City officials including Medical Officer of Health Dr. Eileen de Villa, Health board chair Joe Cressy, and Mayor John Tory. The City projected that the additional financial pressure resulting from would result in further cuts to municipal services or increased taxes. Amidst backlash, Ford announced that the province would keep the cost-sharing arrangement and re-evaluate it at the end of the fiscal year.

Bill 66
On December 6, 2018, the Ford government tabled its omnibus bill, Bill 66. The bill allows municipalities to request a provincial government override of any regulations that currently deter businesses from locating in the region. Ford's political opponents and groups that promote environmental protection raised concerns that the "opaque", "vague language" in Bill 66 could mean clean water regulations and other bylaws that protect environmentally sensitive land could be bypassed. According to a December 7 Globe and Mail article, under Bill 66, municipalities would only be required to obtain permission from the minister of municipal affairs, to override sections of the 2006 Clean Water Act, the 2015 Great Lakes Protection Act, the 2006 Lake Simcoe Protection Act, and the 2005 Greenbelt Act.

Hydro
During his election campaign Ford had promised to lower Ontario's electricity rates by 12 percent. During his campaign, in April 2018, he announced that in order to reduce electricity rates, he would redirect the province's dividends from partial ownership of Hydro One to subsidize market electricity rates, as well as absorbing the cost of conservation programs currently paid for by consumers, at an estimated cost of $800 million per year.

Ford attacked Hydro One CEO Mayo Schmidt, calling him "Kathleen Wynne's $6-million dollar man" in reference to his reported annual salary, and called on the utility's board of directors to resign. Ford vowed to fire them all if elected, although PC energy critic Todd Smith later clarified that the government cannot dismiss Hydro One's CEO directly. He opposed his predecessor's decision to privatize Hydro One, but does not plan to reverse the decision. His government passed legislation to publicly disclose and reduce the salaries of Hydro One's board members and executives. On July 11, 2018, Hydro One CEO Mayo Schmidt resigned along with the entire board.

According to Bloomberg News, by December 5, 2018, Washington Utilities and Transportation Commission, the state's regulators, rejected Hydro One's $3.4 Billion takeover of Avista because of "political risks in Ontario ... from provincial leaders who may not have the company’s well being in mind". Bloomberg also reported that, if the merger was not approved by the state's regulators, Hydro One would have to pay CA$138 million break fee. Because Hydro One is partially owned by the Ontario government, Ontario ratepayers would also be paying the "Parent Termination Fee". Ford denies that he is to blame for the U.S. regulators' decision.

Public safety
Ford came under fire in December 2018 by Ontario Provincial Police (OPP) Deputy Commissioner Brad Blair, who claimed Ford requested the OPP “purchase a large camper-type vehicle ... modified to specifications the premier’s office would provide” and keep the costs “off the books.” The vehicle was intended for the premier to use for work, and reportedly was asked to include a swivel chair. The accusation followed on the heels of Ford appointing a longtime family friend to be the next OPP commissioner just days after lowering the requirements for the position.

In response to increasing calls for one, Ford has stated he opposes a ban on handguns in Ontario.

Ford opposes supervised drug injection sites.

Cannabis 
Ford supports allowing licensed private retailers to sell cannabis, rather than a government monopoly like the LCBO.

Ford opposed the legalization of recreational cannabis. On January 22, 2019, Huffington Post reported that Ford's youngest daughter Kyla, a bodybuilder and fitness trainer, had posted videos promoting health benefits of CBD oil, a cannabis product which typically does not contain the psychoactive compound present in marijuana. Various publications claimed Kyla's promotion wasn't lawful. Ford's daughter took down the posts, but neither Ford nor his daughter commented on them.

Political patronage controversies
In July 2018, Ford hired Rueben Devlin, former PC Party president and a Ford family friend, as a health-care advisor at a salary of $350,000 plus expenses, more than Ford's own salary of $208,974.

In December 2018 Bob Paulson, who served as a Royal Canadian Mounted Police (RCMP) officer for 32-years including as RCMP commissioner before retiring in 2017, called for an independent third-party inquiry into Ford's appointment in December 2018 of Toronto Police Superintendent Ron Taverner, who is a long-time friend of Ford, as the new commissioner of the Ontario Provincial Police. By March 2019, Taverner had stepped down following "months of controversy" that "triggered an integrity commissioner investigation".

A June 20, 2019, article in the Toronto Star said that Ford had awarded "plum patronage posts to two political allies". He hired Jag Badwal as Ontario's agent-general to Britain and the United States with an annual salary of $185,000. Ford named Earl Provost as Ontario's agent-general to Chicago.

On June 28, 2019, Ford's chief of staff, Dean French, resigned "amid a patronage scandal". According to a Globe and Mail article, French resigned "after it was revealed that two people with personal ties to [French], 26 year-old Tyler Albrecht and Taylor Shields were appointed to lucrative positions in New York and London. The Toronto Sun reported in a June 27, 2019, article that 26-year-old Tyler Albrecht, who had a "thin resume", was proposed for a "job that paid $165,000 a year, plus housing and other expenses" as Ontario's "new trade rep in New York City". His qualification was "that he played lacrosse with French's son". TVO's Steve Paikin cited the example of Taylor Shields, who is French's wife's cousin, who was appointed as the trade representative in London, England, with a salary of $185,000 plus expenses. Just hours before French resigned, Ford had cancelled Albrecht's and Shields' appointments.

Thomas Staples, who played on St. Michael's College Varsity Lacrosse team with French as coach, worked in the office of Bill Walker, who was chief government whip. When Walker became minister of government and consumer services in November 2018, Staples worked as his executive assistant and legislative affairs advisor. According to iPolitics, Staples had not completed his undergraduate studies, and had neither the qualifications nor work experience in politics.

French's niece, Katherine Pal, who had been appointed as Ontario's Public Accounts Council resigned after her family ties to French were revealed. According to Paikin, Pal was well qualified to be Public Accounts Council but she resigned because of the bad optics.

On July 4, Peter Fenwick, who served as Ontario's first "strategic transformation adviser" since November 2018, was fired when it was revealed in an interview with The Star that "Fenwick has been a life insurance customer of French's for at least 20 years".

On July 10, Andrew Suboch, a "a personal injury and insurance lawyer" who had served as chair of the Justices of the Peace Appointments Advisory Committee (JPAAC), informed the JPAAC that he was resigning immediately after an article in the Globe revealed that Suboch was another of French's "long-time" friends whose sons played lacrosse together for many years.

According to a July 4, 2019, article in the Toronto Star, John Fraser, interim Ontario Liberal leader, called for a "formal probe" into French's "involvement in appointments" to be undertaken by J. David Wake—Ontario's integrity commissioner—in order "to clear the air and restore public confidence". He asked that Ford "make any findings public" because of the "tremendous influence" French had in Ford's government.

Ford has scoffed at criticism regarding his friendships with property developers, saying, "no one can influence the Fords". Specifically, he called questions about the optics of developers attending his daughter's pre-wedding party in August 2022, 'ridiculous'. Ford sought clearance for the event from the Ontario Integrity Commissioner in January 2023. As of February 11, 2023, the Ontario Provincial Police anti-rackets branch were 'still looking into complaints' about the Ford government's decision to open up a portion of the Greenbelt for development, as announced by Municipal Affairs and Housing Minister Steve Clark in November 2022.

COVID-19 pandemic

Initial outbreak 
In December 2019, an outbreak of coronavirus disease 2019 (COVID-19) was first identified in Wuhan, Hubei, China; it spread worldwide and was recognized as a pandemic by the World Health Organization (WHO) on March 11, 2020. The first confirmed case in Canada was in Ontario—reported on January 27, 2020.

On March 17, Ford declared a state of emergency in Ontario, closing bars and restaurants (with the exception of take-out and delivery services), as well as libraries, theatres, cinemas, schools and daycares and all public gatherings of more than 50 people (later reduced to 5 people on March 28). Furthermore, the government announced on March 17 that Ontario had "some evidence of community transmission" of COVID-19.

On March 23, Ford announced that all "non-essential" businesses be ordered closed starting 11:59 p.m. On March 24. Ford also stated that schools would remain closed past the original April 6 opening date (on May 19 it was announced that schools would remain closed until the following school year in September). A list of 74 "essential" businesses was published later in the day on March 23.

On March 25, Ford and Finance Minister Rod Phillips introduced a $17-billion response package that includes an influx of cash for the health sector, direct payments to parents and tax breaks for businesses.

Third wave 
On April 9, 2021, Ford received his first dose of the AstraZeneca COVID-19 vaccine at a local pharmacy in Toronto, and encouraged eligible Ontarians to get vaccinated.

Amid growing case numbers in mid-2021, the government moved to introduce a third province-wide stay at home order. As part of the response, Ford announced on April 16, 2021, that outdoor amenities including playgrounds would be closed, and that he would be authorizing police to require pedestrians and drivers to explain why they are not at home and provide their home address and other relevant details. The regulations raised concerns about a re-legalization of carding. The government experienced significant backlash with the new enforcement measures, with some commentators – such as the National Post's Randall Denley, a former PC politician – equating the province to a "police state" Members of the Ontario COVID-19 Science Table described the new restrictions as "absolute madness", and not based on science questioning the need to restrict "safe options from people as you do nothing to impact the places where the disease is spreading". After dozens of police services across the province announced that they would refuse to enforce the new measures, Ford promptly rolled back the new enforcement provisions the next day and reopened playgrounds, while keeping other outdoor amenities closed.

Over the weekend following the introduction of new orders, calls for Ford's resignation over his handling of the COVID-19 crisis grew, In April 2021, Ford revealed that he had been in isolation following contact with one of his staffers, who had contracted COVID-19. Ford announced on April 30, 2021, that he had asked the federal government to stop international students from coming into the province in an effort to curb the third wave.

Omicron variant 
During the emergence of the Omicron variant of COVID-19 in December 2021 and January 2022, Ford's government announced in December 2021 new restrictions on indoor settings. After growing calls for third or booster doses of COVID-19 vaccines, the government allowed all Ontarians over 18 years of age to receive a third dose on December 20, 2021.

On January 3, 2022, Ford announced that Ontario would be moving into modified Step 2 on January 5, closing indoor dining, gyms, movie theatres and schools.

Cabinet mandate letters  

Mandate letters requested by the Canadian Broadcasting Corporation through a freedom of information request were not released to the public, despite being ordered to by the Ontario information and privacy commissioner in 2019. The final appeal of the decision is now being sent to the Supreme Court of Canada.

First nations relations 
In March 2021, Ford publicly accused MPP Sol Mamakwa of "jumping the line" to receive his second dose of a COVID-19 vaccine, despite being eligible to receive it. Mamakwa went to his riding to receive the vaccine as an attempt to prevent vaccine hesitancy amongst his constituents. On Thursday, 11 March 2021, Ford apologised for his remark and later said he "got a little personal" when throwing the accusation at Mamakwa. Mamakwa did not say that he accepted Ford's apology but stated that he appreciated the call from Ford.

In September 2021, an Ontario judge issued an injunction on mining in Wiisinin Zaahgi'igan (an area sacred to the Ginoogaming First Nation peoples). The judge ruled that the Ontario government did not consult with the Ginoogaming as is their constitutional duty.

Political endorsements

Ford actively supported the two Toronto mayoral campaigns of his brother Rob Ford. In federal politics, Ford supports the Conservative Party of Canada and several provincial conservative parties, including the Alberta United Conservative Party.

Ford endorsed the economic policies of the Republican Party and the presidency of Donald Trump in the United States, saying his support for Trump is "unwavering". After Trump announced tariffs on Canadian aluminum imports in August 2020, Ford expressed his disapproval, calling Trump's policy "totally unacceptable".

Personal life

Family 

Ford and his wife Karla ( Middlebrook) have four daughters: Krista, Kayla, Kara, and Kyla.

In 2018, Rob's widow sued Doug and Randy for mismanagement of Rob's estate, saying their actions deprived her and her children of due compensation while overseeing business losses at Deco Labels totalling half of the company's market value. In response, Doug alleged that the claims and the lawsuit's timing in the same week as the 2018 Ontario election amounted to extortion.

Ford's mother Diane died from cancer in January 2020.

Over the course of the COVID-19 pandemic, Ford's daughter Krista has controversially engaged in the spread of COVID-19 misinformation and conspiracy theories. In December 2021, Krista and her husband participated in The Christian Fight for Freedom, a panel discussion which included discussions that were anti-vaccine and anti-mask in nature. The event was advertised as having special guests "Dave and Krista Haynes, family of the premier Doug Ford".

Health 
Ford became an "ethical vegetarian" after working in a meatpacking plant as a teenager, and while this is no longer the case, he still does not eat red meat. Ford, who is obese, has struggled with his weight at least since 2012, when he publicly attempted a weight loss challenge. Ford is occasionally fat shamed in the media, having been previously called "unfashionably overweight".

Philanthropy 
In 2014, Doug and his mother donated $90,000 to Humber River Hospital, where Rob Ford was receiving care. Upon Rob's death, Doug and Randy took on stewardship of Rob's share of Deco Labels and Tags.

Electoral record

Municipal election record

Ontario PC Party leadership election

Provincial election record

References

Works cited

Further reading

External links

 Official MPP website
 FordNation Facebook website
 Doug Ford for Mayor – 2014 Toronto Mayoral Collection – Web archive created by the University of Toronto Libraries

Leaders of the Progressive Conservative Party of Ontario
1964 births
Living people
People from Etobicoke
Toronto city councillors
Businesspeople from Toronto
Canadian people of English descent
Premiers of Ontario
Ford political family